Marie of France/of Valois (24 August 1393 – 19 August 1438) was a medieval nun and prioress, born a princess of France from the House of Valois as the daughter of Charles VI, King of France.

Life

Early life 
Marie of France was born at the royal residence of the Château de Vincennes as the sixth child and fourth daughter of Charles VI, King of France (1368–1422) and his wife, born Isabeau of Bavaria (c. 1370–1435). Only three of her five older siblings were still alive at the time of her birth: Isabella, aged 3, Joan, aged 2, and Charles, Dauphin of France, aged 1, but six more children were born to her parents after Marie, five of whom survived to adulthood.

Marie's father seems to have suffered from a hereditary mental disorder. Isabeau decided to dedicate Marie to the service of God, possibly because she saw her husband's apparent madness as divine punishment. The prioress there was her grandaunt, Marie of Bourbon (1347-1401), sister of her paternal grandmother, Joanna of Bourbon, Queen consort of France. 

With Marie, a companion was also sent to Poissy: Marie du Castel, daughter of poet and author Christine de Pizan. Pizan described a visit to the convent from 1400 in her work "Le Livre du dit de Poissy" ("The Book of Poissy"). She was greeted "joyously and tenderly" by the seven-year-old princess, whose lodgings were befitting for her rank.

Adult life 
In 1405, when she was twelve years old, her mother Queen Isabeau and her paternal uncle Louis I, Duke of Orléans visited her to try and convince her to abandon religious life and marry twenty-eight-years-old Edward, Marquis of Pont-à-Mousson (1377–1415), oldest living son and heir of Robert, Duke of Bar, who was an ally of the duke. She refused to do this, saying that only the king, who was at the time mentally unstable, had the power to force her to marry. Remaining at the convent, she took her final vows on 26 May 1408 and spent her life there. Later, she became the prioress of the convent. Marie died of bubonic plague during the pandemic known as the Black Death on 19 August 1438, a few days short of her forty-fifth birthday and was buried at the convent.

Ancestry

References 

15th-century French nuns
1393 births
1438 deaths
House of Valois
People from Poissy
15th-century deaths from plague (disease)
Daughters of kings